Ramoaka Brown (born ) is a Solomon Islands male weightlifter, competing in the 62 kg category and representing Solomon Islands at international competitions. He participated at the 2010 Commonwealth Games in the 62 kg event.

Major competitions

References

1988 births
Living people
Solomon Islands male weightlifters
Weightlifters at the 2010 Commonwealth Games
Commonwealth Games competitors for the Solomon Islands
Place of birth missing (living people)
Weightlifters at the 2014 Commonwealth Games